Márcio Teruel (born March 11, 1986) is a Brazilian footballer.

Career
He started his career in 1999 when he joined the youth team of Mogi Mirim.  He became senior in 2003, and had played with Mogi Mirim in the Campeonato Paulista and the Campeonato Brasileiro Série B.  He left Mogi Mirim in 2005 and joined Barueri playing with them in the Campeonato Brasileiro Série C.  While with Barueri, he also played in the Copa São Paulo de Juniores and in the Copa Federação Paulista.  In 2007, he moved to another Série C side, Roma from Apucarana.  Then he played in 2008 with Paulistão second level side Grêmio Osasco, before returning in 2009 to Mogi Mirim playing in the Campeonato Paulista.  In 2010, he joined Glória from Vacaria and played in the second level of the Campeonato Gaúcho.

In 2011, he made a move abroad, joining Salvadoran side C.D. FAS.  He played with FAS in the Salvadoran Primera División having scored 10 goals between 2011 and 2012. Those good exhibitions made him a move to Europe, and on 28 July 2012 he signed a 2-year contract with Serbian side FK Jagodina.

During summer 2013 he left Serbia and joined Maltese Premier League side Vittoriosa Stars but during winter break he returned to Brazil joining Inter de Limeira.

In 2016, he played the spring with Sitra Club in 2015–16 Bahrain First Division League and then in summer joined Arema Cronus playing in the Indonesian Liga 1. In 2018 he further had a spell in Ecuador with L.D.U. Loja.

Honours
Jagodina
Serbian Cup: 2013

References

External links
 marcioteruel.mteruel.com.br

1986 births
Living people
Footballers from São Paulo
Brazilian footballers
Association football midfielders
Mogi Mirim Esporte Clube players
Grêmio Barueri Futebol players
Roma Esporte Apucarana players
C.D. FAS footballers
Brazilian expatriate footballers
FK Jagodina players
Serbian SuperLiga players
L.D.U. Loja footballers
Vittoriosa Stars F.C. players
Sitra Club players
Bahraini Premier League players
Expatriate footballers in Serbia
Expatriate footballers in Malta
Expatriate footballers in Bahrain
Expatriate footballers in Ecuador
Expatriate footballers in El Salvador
Expatriate footballers in Indonesia
Brazilian expatriate sportspeople in Serbia
Brazilian expatriate sportspeople in Malta
Brazilian expatriate sportspeople in Bahrain
Brazilian expatriate sportspeople in Ecuador
Brazilian expatriate sportspeople in El Salvador
Brazilian expatriate sportspeople in Indonesia